Bowery Buckaroos is a 1947 film starring the comedy team of The Bowery Boys. It is the eighth film in the series and the last Bowery Boys film that Bobby Jordan appeared in.

Plot
Louie is singing the song "Louie the Lout" about his days in the old west to the boys in the Sweet Shop. All of a sudden a man arrives on horseback and Louie hides from him in the back of the store. The man identifies himself as a sheriff of Hangman's Hollow, a town out west where Louie is wanted for a murder that took place 20 years before.  The boys tell the sheriff they never heard of Louie and he leaves. Louie comes out of hiding and tells them the story of when he was a younger man and lived in Hangman's Hollow he and his partner, Pete Briggs, discovered gold.  He then tells them that Pete was murdered by Blackjack McCoy and he was framed for the murder and fled to the city. He then shows them a map of where the gold is hidden...tattooed on his back.

The boys decide to go out west to clear Louie's name and help him give Pete's share to his daughter. They make a copy of the map on Sach's back and head west. They are ambushed by some Indians and Sach unwittingly shows the map to one of them. Indian Joe then heads back to town and alerts Blackjack that the boys are in town to clear Louie's name and claim the gold. Meanwhile, Gabe, who Slip sent ahead, has gotten into Blackjack's good graces with his card tricks and assists Slip and the boys.

Eventually the boys capture Blackjack and have him confess the murder to the sheriff, and just as everyone is about to collect the gold and live happily ever after, Slip hits Sach on the head waking him up. We learn that it was all Sach's dream.

Cast

The Bowery Boys
 Leo Gorcey as Terrance Aloysius 'Slip' Mahoney
 Huntz Hall as Horace Debussy 'Sach' Jones
 Bobby Jordan as Bobby
 William Benedict as Whitey
 David Gorcey as Chuck

Remaining cast
 Gabriel Dell as Gabe
 Bernard Gorcey as Louie Dumbrowski
 Julie Gibson as Carolyn Briggs
 Jack Norman as Blackjack McCoy
 Iron Eyes Cody as Indian Joe
 Minerva Urecal as Kate Barlow
 Russell Simpson as Luke Barlow

Production
This was the last Bowery Boys movie for Bobby Jordan. Growing tired of having to take a backseat to co-stars Leo Gorcey and Huntz Hall, he decided to quit the series.

According to Julie Gibson, early in production Leo Gorcey attempted to steal a humorous line of dialogue scripted for Gibson. Not knowing that Gorcey was essentially the executive producer of the series, she told him off. Gorcey ultimately backed off. Gibson later found out that this was a common practice by Gorcey towards his fellow Bowery Boys.

Home media
Released on VHS by Warner Brothers on September 1, 1998.

Warner Archives released the film on made-to-order DVD in the United States as part of "The Bowery Boys, Volume Two" on April 9, 2013.

References

External links 
 
 
 
 

1947 films
Bowery Boys films
1940s English-language films
Monogram Pictures films
Films directed by William Beaudine
American musical comedy films
1947 musical comedy films
1940s American films